Pine Grove is the name of several communities in Ontario:
Pine Grove, Lanark Highlands, Ontario
Pinegrove, one of the Communities in Norfolk County, Ontario
Pine Grove, North Glengarry, Ontario
Pine Grove, Regional Municipality of York, Ontario